The Castleford Tigers (known as just Castleford until 1996) are an English rugby league club who have had numerous notable players (943 as of 30 June 2021) throughout their history, each player of the rugby league era who has played (and so excludes non-playing substitutes) in a competitive first-class match (including those matches that were subsequently abandoned, expunged or re-played, but excluding friendlies) is included.

Players

 ^¹ = Played For Castleford (Tigers) During More Than One Period
 ^² = drop-goals are currently worth 1-point, but from the 1897–98 season to prior to the 1973–74 season all goals, whether; conversions, penalties, or drop-goals, scored two points, consequently during this time drop-goals were often not explicitly documented, and "0" indicates that drop-goals may not have been recorded, rather than no drop-goals scored. In addition, prior to the 1949–50 season, the Field-goal was also still a valid means of scoring points
 ^³ = During the first two seasons of the Northern Union (now known as the Rugby Football League), i.e. the 1895–96 season and 1896–97 season, conversions were worth 2-points, penalty goals 3-points and drop goals 4-points
 ¢ = player has (potential) links to other rugby league clubs on Wikipedia
 BBC = BBC2 Floodlit Trophy
 CC = Challenge Cup
 CF = Championship Final
 CM = Captain Morgan Trophy
 RT = League Cup, i.e. Player's No. 6, John Player (Special), Regal Trophy
 YC = Yorkshire County Cup
 YL = Yorkshire League

Notes
The players named  are likely to be trialists from rugby union whose identities were being protected to prevent the player from facing a life-time ban from rugby union in the era prior to 1995 when rugby union was strictly amateur, and any association with rugby league was considered an act of professionalism.

References

Players

Castleford Tigers